Mark Donowitz is an American physiologist whose research focuses on the gastrointestinal system, gastroenterology, pathophysiology, diarrhea, drugs, and physiology. He currently works at Johns Hopkins University and is an elected Fellow of the American Association for the Advancement of Science.

References

Living people
American physiologists
Fellows of the American Association for the Advancement of Science
Year of birth missing (living people)